Laval is a city in Quebec, Canada. It is in the southwest of the province, north of Montreal. It is the largest suburb of Montreal, the third-largest city in the province after Montreal and Quebec City, and the thirteenth largest city in Canada, with a population of 443,192 in 2021.

Laval is geographically separated from the mainland to the north by the Rivière des Mille Îles, and from the Island of Montreal to the south by the Rivière des Prairies. Laval occupies all of Île Jésus as well as the Îles Laval.

Laval constitutes one of the 17 administrative regions of Quebec, with a region code of 13, as well as a territory equivalent to a regional county municipality (TE) and census division (CD) with geographical code 65. It also constitutes the judicial district of Laval. It is the smallest administrative region in the province by area.

History

The first European Settlers in Laval were Jesuits, who were granted a seigneury there in 1636. Agriculture first appeared in Laval in 1670. In 1675, François de Montmorency-Laval gained control of the seigneury. In 1702 a parish municipality was founded, and dedicated to Saint-François de Sales (not to be confused with the modern-day Saint-François-de-Sales in Saguenay–Lac-Saint-Jean).

In 1845, after nearly 200 years being of a rural nature, additional municipalities began to be created. The only built-up area on the island, Sainte-Rose, was incorporated as a village in 1850, and it remained the main community for the remainder of the century. With the dawn of the 20th century came urbanization. Laval-sur-le-Lac was founded in the same year and had its tourist-based economy based on Montrealers. Laval began to grow throughout the following years because its proximity to Montreal made it an ideal suburb.

The amalgamation turned out to be so successful for the municipalities involved that the Quebec government decided to amalgamate the whole island into a single city of Laval in 1965, not without controversy. Laval was named after the first owner of Île Jésus, François de Montmorency-Laval, the first Roman Catholic Bishop of Quebec. At the time, Laval had a population of 170,000. Laval became a Regional County Municipality in 1980. Until then, it had been the County of Laval.

The 14 municipalities, which existed prior to the incorporation of the amalgamated City of Laval on 6 August 1965, were:

Geography
The island has developed over time, with most of the urban area in the central region and along the south and west river banks.

Laval is bordered on the south by Montreal across the Rivière des Prairies, on the north by Les Moulins Regional County Municipality and by Thérèse-De Blainville Regional County Municipality and on the west by Deux-Montagnes Regional County Municipality across the Rivière des Mille Îles.

Climate
Laval experiences a four season humid continental climate (Koppen: Dfb) with very warm summers and very cold winters with adequate precipitation year round, though more so during summer and early fall.

Demographics 

According to the 2016 Census, the population of Laval was an estimated 422,993, a 5.3 percent increase from the earlier census in 2011. Women constituted 51.4% of the total population. Children under 14 years of age totalled 17.4%, while 17.2% of the population was of retirement age (65 years of age and older). The median age was calculated as 41.9 years.

Ethnicity 

Note: Totals greater than 100% due to multiple origin responses.

Immigration

Language 
Laval is linguistically diverse. The 2011 census found that French was the sole mother tongue of 60.8% of the population, and was spoken most often at home by 65.2% of residents. The next most common mother tongues were English (7.0%), Arabic (5.6%), Italian (4.2%), Greek (3.5%), Spanish (2.9%), Armenian (1.7%), Creoles (1.6%), Romanian (1.3%) and Portuguese (1.3%).

Religion 
According to the 2021 census, religious groups in Laval included:
Christianity (280,720 persons or 65.4%)
Irreligion (77,165 persons or 18.0%)
Islam (55,620 persons or 12.9%)
Buddhism (5,940 persons or 1.4%)
Hinduism (4,140 persons or 1.0%)
Judaism (2,435 persons or 0.6%)
Sikhism (2,235 persons or 0.5%)
Indigenous Spirituality (10 persons or <0.1%)
Other (1,280 persons or 0.3%)

Government

Municipal politics

The city's longtime mayor, Gilles Vaillancourt, resigned on 9 November 2012, following allegations of corruption made against him in hearings of the provincial Charbonneau Commission. City councillor Basile Angelopoulos served as acting mayor until Alexandre Duplessis was selected in a council vote on 23 November. Duplessis, in turn, stepped down after just seven months in office after facing allegations of being implicated in a prostitution investigation; he was succeeded by city councillor Martine Beaugrand until the city's new mayor, Marc Demers, was elected in the 2013 municipal election.

Past mayors have been:
 Jean-Noël Lavoie (founding mayor), 1965
 Jacques Tétreault, 1965–1973
 Lucien Paiement, 1973–1981
 Claude Lefebvre, 1981–1989
 Gilles Vaillancourt, 1989–2012
 Alexandre Duplessis, 2012–2013
 Martine Beaugrand, 2013
 Marc Demers, 2013–2021
 Stéphane Boyer, 2021–present

On 3 June 2013, the provincial government of Pauline Marois placed the city under trusteeship due to the ongoing corruption scandal affecting the city. Florent Gagné, a former head of the Sûreté du Québec, will serve as the city's head trustee, with responsibility for reviewing and approving or rejecting all decisions made by city council. Municipal Affairs Minister Sylvain Gaudreault said that Laval's Mayor Alexandre Duplessis and his council will continue to serve, but council decisions must be approved by the trustees. Duplessis, in turn, resigned as mayor on 28 June 2013, after being implicated in a separate prostitution allegation.

Flag, seal and motto
On a white-yellow background, the emblem of Laval illustrates the modernism of a city in full expansion. The sign of the city symbolizes the "L" of Laval.

The colours also have a significant meaning:
 Dark red represents the affluence and economic potential of Laval.
 Blue symbolizes the quality of life and the installation of a human city.

The "L" of Laval is made of cubes that represent the development of Laval.

The letters of the Laval signature are related one to the other to point out the merger of the 14 municipalities of Jesus island in 1965.

The logo (that is on the flag) has existed since the 1980s and the flag since the 1990s.

Federal and provincial politics

Politically, Laval has been historically a battleground area between the Quebec separatist parties (the Bloc Québécois federally and the Parti Québécois provincially) and the federalist parties (various parties federally and the Quebec Liberal Party provincially). The only exception is Chomedey in the south, which voted overwhelmingly to not separate in the 1995 Quebec referendum.

The other parts of Laval have drifted to the provincial Liberals in recent years. While the PQ held every Laval riding except Chomedey during their second stint in government between 1994 and 2003, the Liberals won every Laval riding in 2003, 2007, and 2008. During the 2012 election, the PQ saw some gains in Laval when they captured 2 seats, but both returned to the Liberal fold during the 2014 election.

Economy

Laval's diverse economy is centred around the technology, pharmaceutical, industrial and retail sectors. It has many pharmaceutical laboratories but also stone quarries and a persistent agricultural sector. Long seen as a bedroom community, Laval has diversified its economy, especially in the retail sector, developing numerous shopping malls, warehouses and various retail stores. Laval has four different industrial parks.

The first is Industrial Park Centre, in the heart of Laval at the corner of St. Martin West and Industriel Blvd. One of the largest municipal industrial parks in Quebec, the Industrial Park Centre boasts the highest concentration of manufacturing companies in Laval: 1,024 at last count, and 22,378 employees. The park still has  of space available.

The second, the Autoroute 25 Industrial Park is at the crossroads of the metropolitan road network. Inaugurated in 2001, this new industrial municipal space has been a tremendous success, boasting an 80% occupancy rate. Laval is studying the possibility of expanding this park in the next few years.

The third, known as Industrial Park East, is in the neighbourhood of Saint-Vincent-de-Paul. This park has reached full capacity with a 100% occupancy rate. Industrial Park East is currently part of a municipal program to revitalize municipal services and public utilities. Laval is working with a private developer on an expansion project for the park that should be announced in the near future.

The fourth industrial park, the Laval Science and High Technology Park is located along Rivière des Prairies and Autoroute 15. It is an internationally renowned science campus that houses the Biotech City and the Information Technology Development Centre (ITDC). The Laval Science and High Technology Park is a beacon of the metropolitan economy, in an environment befitting the best technopolises in the world. Nearly  of space are available for development. The Biotech City spans the entire territory of the Laval Science and High Technology Park and is a unique concept in Canada in that its residents comprise both universities and companies.

Created in 1995, Laval Technopole is a nonprofit organization that has the objective to promote the economic growth of Laval by attracting and supporting new business and investments located in its 5 territory poles: Biopole, e-Pol, Agropole, industrial pole and Leisure/tourism.

Alimentation Couche-Tard has its headquarters in Laval.

Sport

Laval was the host-city of the "Jeux du Québec" held in summer 1991 and of the Canadian Hockey League's 1994 Memorial Cup. Laval became home to the Montreal Canadiens' American Hockey League affiliate the Laval Rocket, starting in the 2017–18 season.

Transportation

Roads

Highways

 A-13 (Chomedey Highway) – Montreal to Boisbriand
 A-15 (Laurentian Highway) – New York state to Sainte-Agathe-des-Monts
 A-19 (Papineau Highway) – Montreal to Boulevard Dagenais, continues as Route 335 to Bois-des-Filion and beyond
 A-25 – Boucherville to Saint-Esprit via Montreal and the A-440 (Laval)
 A-440 (Autoroute Jean-Noël-Lavoie) – Laval

Provincial routes
 Route 117 – Montreal to Ontario Highway 66 past Rouyn-Noranda
 Route 125 – Montreal to Saint-Donat
 Route 148 – Laval to Pembroke, Ontario
 Route 335 – Montreal to the Lanaudière region past Saint-Calixte

Incidents
 2000 Boulevard du Souvenir overpass collapse: On 18 June 2000, during renovations to the Souvenir Boulevard overpass over Highway 15, the southern section collapsed onto the highway, causing the death of one person.
 De la Concorde Overpass collapse: On 30 September 2006, the De la Concorde overpass over Autoroute 19 suddenly collapsed killing five people.

Public transit
Montreal Metro

In April 2007, the Montreal Metro was extended to Laval with three stations. The long-awaited stations were begun in 2003 and completed in April 2007, two months ahead of the revised schedule, at a cost of C$803 million, funded entirely by the Quebec government. The stations are Cartier, De La Concorde, and Montmorency. The arrival of the Metro in Laval was long-awaited as it was first promised in the 1960s. Former mayor, Gilles Vaillancourt, announced his wish to loop the Orange line from Montmorency to Côte-Vertu stations with the addition of six new stations (three in Laval and another three in Montreal). He proposed that Transports Quebec, the provincial transport department, set aside C$100 million annually to fund the project, which was expected to cost upwards of $1.5 billion.

Commuter rail
The Exo public transit agency's Saint-Jérôme commuter train line traverses the island, connecting Laval to downtown Montreal. There are currently three train stations in Laval: De la Concorde (an intermodal station offering transfer to the metro), Vimont and Sainte-Rose.

The Deux-Montagnes commuter train line served the western tip of Laval until it was closed on December 31, 2020. Work is underway to replace it with the Réseau express métropolitain (REM) light metro system.

Buses

The Société de transport de Laval (STL) provides local bus service in Laval. The STL's network consists of 35 regular lines, two rush hour lines, two trainbus lines, three express lines, one community circuit and several taxi lines.

There are reserved lanes for buses and taxis on Chomedey Blvd between Le Carrefour Blvd and the Des Prairies River (Lachapelle Bridge) and beyond as well as along boulevard des Laurentides between rue Proulx and boulevard Cartier (the reserved lane, in this case for buses only, continues onto the Pont Viau bridge into Montreal until the Terminus Laval at the Henri-Bourassa Metro station). Most buses that use the reserved lane end their journey at the Cartier Metro station. The AMT and the City of Laval have developed reserved bus and taxi lanes on Notre-Dame Boulevard between Vincent Massey Street and Place Alton-Goldbloom and another on De la Concorde Blvd between De l'Avenir and Laval Blvds, as well as between Ampere Ave and Roanne St. These reserved lanes (Notre-Dame and De la Concorde are the same boulevard but change name where they meet under Autoroute 15) opened shortly after 31 October 2007.

Education

Laval is home to a variety of vocational/technical centres, colleges and universities, including:

The city has two separate school boards serving Laval: the Centre de services scolaire de Laval (formerly the Commission scolaire de Laval) for French-speaking students and the Sir Wilfrid Laurier School Board for English-speaking students. There is one community English-language high school in the city: Laval Senior Academy, created on 1 July 2015 by the merger of Laval Liberty High School and Laurier Senior High School.

North Star Academy Laval is the only private English high school in Laval. They offer secondary 1 to 5 and the possibility to do a grade 12 diploma from Ontario via their online platform.

Attractions

Laval's main attractions are:

Source: Tourisme Laval.

Media
Laval is served by media from Montreal, however it does have some of its own regional media outlets.

Two radio stations are licensed to serve the city: CJLV 1570 AM "Radio Mieux-être" (formerly CFAV) and CFGL 105.7 FM "Rythme FM".

Additionally, there are three major newspapers in Laval: the bi-weekly English-language The Laval News, the bi-weekly French-language Le Courrier Laval and the weekly French-language L'Écho de Laval.

One television community channel operates on Laval's territory, Télévision régionale de Laval, as part of Videotron cable's VOX network.

Twin towns – sister cities

Laval is twinned with:

 Botoșani, Romania
 Klagenfurt, Austria
 Laval, France
 Nice, France
 Pedro Aguirre Cerda, Chile
 Ribeira Grande, Portugal
 San Salvador, El Salvador

Friendship and cooperation
Laval also cooperates with:

 Grenoble, France
 Mudanjiang, China
 Padua Province, Italy
 Petah Tikva, Israel
 Saskatoon, Canada

See also
 List of people from Laval, Quebec
 List of Quebec regions
 List of crossings of the Rivière des Mille Îles
 List of crossings of the Rivière des Prairies
 Bibliothèque de Laval

Notes

References

External links

 
Cities and towns in Quebec
Territories equivalent to a regional county municipality
1965 establishments in Quebec
Populated places established in 1636
1636 establishments in the French colonial empire
Administrative regions of Quebec
Greater Montreal